Lakeside Mall is a Taubman-built super-regional full-line shopping mall located in the northeastern Metro Detroit suburb of Sterling Heights, Michigan. The mall is located on M-59 (Hall Road) between Hayes and Schoenherr Roads. The mall currently features the tenants Macy's and JCPenney. The mall features staples such as Express and Hollister. The mall is on two levels, and features food court. Lakeside Mall is the largest mall in the state of Michigan.

In the 1980s, the mall was the first in Michigan to feature an indoor tubular waterslide called the Hydrotube,
The waterslide covered large areas of the mall making it highly notable.

History 
Lakeside Mall started as a joint-venture between A. Alfred Taubman and Homart Development. It opened on March 2, 1976 with four anchor stores: Hudson's, Sears, Crowley's, and JCPenney, with Lord & Taylor added in 1978 as a fifth anchor. In 1983, Toys "R" Us opened a store across from the mall. In 1999, after the Crowley's chain filed for bankruptcy, Hudson's purchased the Crowley's building and moved its men's clothing and home goods into it.

In 1988, Rodamco acquired Homart's interest in the center and became a 50/50 joint venture partner with Taubman. In 2000, Rodamco became 100-percent owner of Lakeside in an interest swap with Taubman involving Taubman's Twelve Oaks Mall in Novi, Michigan. In 2001, Hudson's stores were renamed Marshall Field's as part of a nameplate consolidation by parent Target Corp. Steve & Barry's also opened. f.y.e. relocated in 2006 to a smaller store, and H&M opened its first Michigan location in June 2006.

Marshall Field's was one of several nameplates converted to Macy's in 2006, as Federated Department Stores (now Macy's, Inc.) had acquired Marshall Fields' then-parent, May Company. Both the main and auxiliary Field's stores at Lakeside Mall were rebranded. A year later, plans were announced for a $3 million renovation of the mall and its periphery. Renovations included new signage and improved pedestrian access to the mall. Exterior renovations began in late 2008. In 2014, Lakeside Mall cleared out a part of the lower level Sears wing to make way for an MC Sports. In 2016, a Jeepers! opened, relocating from Great Lakes Crossing Outlets. MC Sports closed in 2017 along with the rest of the chain due to their bankruptcy. Also in 2017, the mall was acquired by Jones Lang LaSalle, due to GGP defaulting on one of its loans. Later in the year, Macy's Backstage opened in part of the main Macy's store.
On March 15, 2018, Toys "R" Us announced that it would be closing all U.S stores including the one across from Lakeside Mall. The store closed June 29, 2018. 
On May 31, 2018, Sears Holdings announced that the Sears location at the mall would be closing as part of a plan to close 72 stores nationwide. The Auto Center closed in late July, while the store itself closed on September 2.

In 2018, the city of Sterling Heights unveiled future plans for the mall's property, due to the mall consistently losing more tenants due to the retail apocalypse. 

In February 2019, JCPenney announced that it would get out of the Appliance and Furniture business, resulting in the closure of the JCPenney Furniture and Appliance outlet in front of the store.

On April 12, 2019, the Jeepers! location at the mall was ordered to close its 4 rides by the Michigan Licensing and Regulatory Affairs due to safety violations, but they have since reopened and Jeepers! later closed in 2020 due to COVID-19.

On June 4, 2019, it was announced that Lord & Taylor would also be closing their Lakeside Mall store in September 2019. The store closed on September 15, 2019.

On December 18, 2019, it was announced that the mall had been once again sold, this time to Miami-based company Out Of The Box Ventures, for $26.5 Million. In addition, it was announced that the mall's surrounding properties would be redeveloped to a mixed use development, surrounding the mall, which will remain intact. 

On November 18, 2021, Total Wine and More opened in the old Toys "R" Us space.

References

External links 
Lakeside Mall Website

Shopping malls in Michigan
Shopping malls established in 1976
Brookfield Properties
Shopping malls in Macomb County, Michigan
1976 establishments in Michigan
Sterling Heights, Michigan